The Parque de la Memoria is a public space situated in front of the Río de la Plata estuary in the northern end of the Belgrano section of Buenos Aires. It is a memorial to the victims of the 1976–1983 military regime, known as the National Reorganization Process, during the Dirty War, a period of unprecedented state-sponsored violence in Argentina.

Origin
The origin of Memory Park came from human rights organizations and the government of Buenos Aires approved the park's construction on July 21, 1998.

Location
Memory park is located along the Río de la Plata, on Buenos Aires' North Costanera Avenue, near the Ciudad Universitaria.

Characteristics
In October 2006 a ramped path was installed as well as commemorative sculptures, dedicated to the victims of the government sponsored violence. The ramped path is meant to form a giant "wound" in the lawn of the park leading toward the river, where the name of those killed or vanished are located. The park contains 18 sculptures, 12 of which were chosen through a competition, the other six were by artists with a commitment to human rights. Sculptures by Roberto Aizenberg, William G. Tucker, and Dennis Oppenheim were installed  and dedicated at the park during October 2006. There is also a public meeting hall in the park used for purposes related to the arts, science and the memory of the victims of the reorganization.

The park contains untitled works by artists Aizenberg, Clorindo Testa, and Jenny Holzer. Some of the other works in the park include: Memoria espacial by Per Kirkeby, La casa de la historia by Marjetica Potrc, Figuras caminando by Magdalena Abakanowicz by Leo Vinci, and Por gracia recibida by Carlos Distéfano.

References
Parque de la Memoria, Commission on Monuments to the Victims of State Sponsored Terrorism, official site, Spanish. Retrieved 29 October 2007.

Dirty War
Parks in Buenos Aires
Tourist attractions in Buenos Aires